The National Grammar Schools Association is an organisation in the United Kingdom which campaigns for the promotion of selective education.

History
It was formed in the 1970s. Following Circular 10/65 in 1965, issued by the Wilson Labour government (grammar school-educated Wilson sent both his sons to the independent University College School), LEAs across the UK dismantled most grammar schools. However, many comprehensive areas have sixth form colleges (for many there is no other choice of school after 16) which are often in former grammar schools and usually have equally high standards as grammar schools at A level. The United Kingdom Independence Party publicly supports selective education.

Northern Ireland

Northern Ireland was not affected by the Circular 10/65, and has kept all its grammar schools. However, there are current well-formed proposals, largely (if not solely) driven by Sinn Féin, to turn Northern Ireland comprehensive.

Academic concerns of comprehensive schools
At GCSE, comprehensive schools, on the whole, are able to get children to an adequate standard, except for most inner cities. However at A level, notably in science, comprehensive school areas weight-for-weight do not generally produce comparative results with areas with grammar schools. This may be a supply and demand question, because areas with grammar schools have higher average house prices.

Function
It represents the 164 grammar schools in England and the 69 in Northern Ireland that are in existence. Two thirds of English LEAs do not have grammar schools. It produces the publication called NGSA News. It seeks to prevent the few Labour-controlled LEAs that have grammar schools from taking them into the comprehensive system. The Chairman is the former Unionist MP for North Down from 1995-2001.

See also
 Campaign for State Education - supports the comprehensive system
 Campaign for Real Education - broadly supports the work of the NGSA
 School violence in the United Kingdom
 Young Gifted and Talented Programme

External links
 National Grammar Schools Association

News items
 Admissions in October 2008
 Ballots in July 2004
 Diplomas in June 2004

Educational organisations based in the United Kingdom
Grammar schools in England
Grammar schools in Northern Ireland
Education in England
Education in Northern Ireland
Organizations established in the 1970s